Lamballe (Gallo: Lanball) is a town and a former commune in the Côtes-d'Armor department in Brittany in northwestern France. On 1 January 2019, it was merged into the new commune Lamballe-Armor.

Lamballe station is served by high speed trains to Brest, Rennes and Paris, and regional trains to Brest, Saint-Brieuc, Dol-de-Bretagne and Rennes.

History 
Lamballe was the capital of the territory of the Counts of Penthièvre, who in 1569 were made dukes. La Noue, the famous Huguenot leader, was mortally wounded in 1591 in the siege of the castle, which was dismantled in 1626 by Richelieu. The last Duke of Penthièvre granted his son Louis the title Prince of Lamballe. The Prince de Lamballe married Marie Therese de Savoie-Carignan and she took the title Princesse de Lamballe. The Princesse lived with her father-in-law after the early death of her husband. She was a close friend of Queen Marie Antoinette and one of the most famous victims of the French Revolution.

Charles Armand Tuffin, marquis de la Rouërie, hero of the American war of independence, died near Lamballe in 1793. Chilean dictator Augusto Pinochet's ascendant, Guillame Pinochet, was a Lamballe native of Breton descent. He migrated to then-Spanish Chile in the 18th century.

On 1 January 2016 the former commune of Meslin was merged into Lamballe.

Population

Inhabitants of Lamballe are called lamballais in French.

Sights

Crowning the eminence on which the town is built is a beautiful Gothic church (13th and 14th centuries), once the chapel of the castle of the counts of Penthièvre.

Of the other buildings, the church of St Martin (11th, 16th and 16th centuries) is the chief.

Economy
Lamballe has an important haras (depôt for stallions) and carries on trade in grain, tanning and leather-dressing; earthenware is manufactured in the environs.

The town of Lamballe is noted for its exceptional weekly market. Although held on Thursday mornings only, this market is known as one of France's finest, with people travelling from far and wide to visit it and to enjoy its gastronomic delights. According to locals, something that must be tried here is a local speciality of gallettes with sausages, apparently irresistibly delicious, and also the Breton buckwheat pancakes (Gallettes, the sweet ones are the crepes that we are all familiar with),  cider and seafood for which the area is famed.

International relations
Lamballe is twinned with Oliveira do Bairro, Portugal

See also
Communes of the Côtes-d'Armor department
Élie Le Goff Sculptor of Lamballe war memorial

References

External links

Official website 

 http://www.cm-olb.pt/PageGen.aspx?WMCM_PaginaId=29015

Former communes of Côtes-d'Armor